Ali Al-Hasan (born 4 January 1973) is a Kuwaiti diver. He competed in the 1996 Summer Olympics.

References

External links
 

1973 births
Living people
Divers at the 1996 Summer Olympics
Kuwaiti male divers
Olympic divers of Kuwait